The 1987 Stockholm Open was a men's tennis tournament played on indoor hard courts and part of the 1987 Nabisco Grand Prix; the tournament took place at the Kungliga tennishallen in Stockholm, Sweden. The tournament was held from 2 November until 8 November 1987. First-seeded Stefan Edberg won the singles title.

Finals

Singles

 Stefan Edberg defeated  Jonas Svensson, 7–5, 6–2, 4–6, 6–4
 It was Edberg's 7th singles title of the year and the 15th of his career.

Doubles

 Stefan Edberg /  Anders Järryd defeated  Jim Grabb /  Jim Pugh, 6–3, 6–4

References

External links
 
 ATP tournament profile
 ITF tournament edition details

Stockholm Open
Stockholm Open
Stock
November 1987 sports events in Europe
1980s in Stockholm